Pogrund is a surname. Notable people with the surname include: 

 Benjamin Pogrund (born 1933), South African-born Israeli author
 Gabriel Pogrund, British journalist